State Road 55 (NM 55) is a state highway in the US state of New Mexico. NM 55's southern terminus is at U.S. Route 54 (US 55) west-northwest of Ancho and the northern terminus is in the village of Estancia at NM 41.

History

In the 1930s, the section of highway between Cuba and Farmington was known as NM 55. By 1940, NM 44 was moved to the road NM 55 followed, and the NM 55 designation was removed. In the early 1940s the portion from Estancia to Tajique was named NM 55 when NM 10 (later NM 14) was extended south over the remainder of NM 15. For a brief time in the early 1940s, the segment between Claunch and US 54 was designated NM 195. In 1988, NM 14 was broken up into several routes to eliminate concurrent segments with other routes, and NM-55 assumed the former portion of NM 14 south of Tajique. Currently it covers the entire length of the original route NM 15.

Major intersections

See also

References

055
Transportation in Lincoln County, New Mexico
Transportation in Socorro County, New Mexico
Transportation in Torrance County, New Mexico